Judith Shatin (born November 21, 1949) is an American composer. Currently, she is William R. Kenan, Jr. Professor at the University of Virginia. She also founded and is Director of the Virginia Center for Computer Music. She holds degrees from Douglass College, the Juilliard School, and Princeton University, at which institution she was a pupil of Milton Babbitt.

In 2012 Shatin was honored as one of the Library of Virginia's "Virginia Women in History".

References

External links
Current performances and presentations of Judith Shatin compositions
Performance archive of Judith Shatin compositions
Complete list of Judith Shatin compositions
Video performances of Judith Shatin compositions
Available sheet music, CDs, and DVDs of Judith Shatin compositions
 Judith Shatin's biography (at the Library of Virginia website)
Curriculum Vitae of Judith Shatin (PDF format)
Judith Shatin's website
Interview with Judith Shatin, May 26, 2005

American women classical composers
American classical composers
Living people
University of Virginia faculty
American women in electronic music
20th-century classical composers
21st-century classical composers
21st-century American composers
Rutgers University alumni
Juilliard School alumni
Princeton University alumni
Pupils of Milton Babbitt
1949 births
20th-century American women musicians
20th-century American composers
21st-century American women musicians
20th-century women composers
21st-century women composers
American women academics